Denis Borisovich Korolyov (born 19 April 1987) is a Russian former professional football player.

Club career
He played in the Russian Football National League for FC MVD Rossii Moscow and FC Volgar-Gazprom-2 Astrakhan in 2009.

External links
 

1987 births
People from Ramensky District
Living people
Russian footballers
FC Volgar Astrakhan players
FC Sakhalin Yuzhno-Sakhalinsk players
FC Saturn Ramenskoye players
Association football midfielders
FC Sever Murmansk players
FC MVD Rossii Moscow players
Sportspeople from Moscow Oblast